Lüftner Cruises, also operating under Amadeus River Cruises, is a cruise operator based in Innsbruck, Austria that offers European river cruises.

History 
The Lüftner family has been involved modern European river cruising since the 1970s, having previously operated Lufter Reizen. Lüftner Cruises was founded in 1994 by Wolfgang Lüftner and Martina Lüftner and remains a family business. At first the company only used chartered ships. In 1997, it began to establish its own fleet with the construction of MS Amadeus. It is often credited with helping to launch the river cruise industry In 2015, the company started calling in Australia. In response to the COVID-19 pandemic in Europe Luftner suspended all river cruises from March 2020-June 2021.

Amadeus fleet 
As of 2020, Lüftner Cruises had a fleet of 16 Amadeus ships, which have been built by the De Hoop Shipyards in the Netherlands.  with the exception of Amadeus Star, built by GS Yard. In 2020, the company placed order for Amadeus Cara.

{| class="wikitable"
!Ship
!Entered service
!Length
!Passengers
!Flag
|-
|Amadeus Imperial'
|2020
|135 × 11.4 m
|168
|DE
|-
|Amadeus Star|2019
|135 × 11.4 m
|164
|DE
|-
|Amadeus Queen|2018
|135 × 11.4 m
|162
|DE
|-
|Amadeus Silver III|2016
|135 × 11.4 m
|168
|DE
|-
|Amadeus Silver II|2015
|135 × 11.4 m
|168
|DE
|-
|Amadeus Silver|2013
|135 × 11.4 m
|180
|DE
|-
|Amadeus Provence|2017
|110 × 11.4 m
|140
|DE
|-
|Amadeus Diamond|2009 (renovated 2019)
|110 × 11.4 m
|146
|DE
|-
|Amadeus Brilliant|2011 (renovated 2020)
|110 × 11.4 m
|150
|DE
|-
|Amadeus Elegant|2010
|110 × 11.4 m
|150
|DE
|-
|Amadeus Princess|2006 (renovated 2020)
|110 × 11.4 m
|160
|DE
|-
|Amadeus Royal|2005 (renovated 2015)
|110 × 11.4 m
|142
|DE
|-
|Amadeus Symphony|2003 (renovated 2014)
|110 × 11.4 m
|144
|DE
|-
|Amadeus Classic|2001 (renovated 2013)
|110 × 11.4 m
|144
|DE
|-
|Amadeus Rhapsody|1998 (renovated 2014)
|110 × 11.4 m
|146
|DE
|-
|Amadeus|1997 (renovated 2019)
|110 × 11.4 m
|146
|DE
|}

 Cruises Amadeus ships cover many European countries (Austria, Slovakia, Serbia, Croatia, Bulgaria, Romania, Hungary, Germany, France, Belgium and the Netherlands), various rivers (the Danube, Rhine, Main, Mosel, Rhône, Saône and Seine) and also Belgian and Dutch inland waterways. The company also runs themed cruises for golfers and fans of classical music.

 Awards 

 2013: "River Ship of the Year 2013" (Flussschiff des Jahres 2013) for the Amadeus Silver II, presented by the Kreuzfahrt Guide''
 2011: "Green Globe Highest Achievement Award 2011" (Cruise category) presented by Green Globe

References

External links

Travel and holiday companies of Austria
Companies based in Innsbruck
Cruise lines